Llanbadarn Fawr may relate to the following places in Wales:

Llanbadarn Fawr, Ceredigion, a village and community in Ceredigion
Llanbadarn Fawr, Powys, a village and community in Powys